Xander Straat (born 1965) is a Dutch stage, television, and film actor.

He studied at the theatre school in Arnhem.

Filmography
Juju (1996)
Wilhelmina (2001) (TV film)
Black Book (2006)
Achtste Groepers Huilen Niet (2012)

He directed the children's opera 'De familie Windsor' of Matijs de Roo, for '5 year Opera Festival' in Austerlitz, performed by the Young London Opera and 45 children and directed by Stefan Hofkes.

References

External links

1965 births
Dutch male film actors
Dutch male stage actors
Dutch male television actors
Living people
20th-century Dutch male actors
21st-century Dutch male actors